İpek Soroğlu (born 12 March 1985, in Istanbul) is a Turkish volleyball player. She is 192 cm and plays as middle blocker and plays for Bursa Büyükşehir Beld.

Career
İpek signed a 3 years contract with Fenerbahçe Acıbadem in June 2009. She previously played for Vakıfbank Güneş Sigorta, Beşiktaş and Galatasaray.

İpek won the bronze medal at the 2010–11 CEV Champions League with Fenerbahçe Acıbadem.

Soroğlu played with Fenerbahçe in the 2012 FIVB Club World Championship held in Doha, Qatar and helped her team to win the bronze medal after defeating Puerto Rico's Lancheras de Cataño 3–0.

Clubs
 Galatasaray (2002–2003)
 VakıfBank S.K. (2003–2007)
 Beşiktaş (2007–2009)
 Fenerbahçe (2009–2014)
 Bursa Büyükşehir Beld. (2014- ....)

Awards

National Team
 2009 Mediterranean Games -  Silver Medal
 2009 European League -  Silver Medal
 2010 European League -  Bronze Medal

Clubs
 2003-04 Turkish Championship -  Champion, with Güneş Sigorta
 2003-04 Top Teams Cup -   Champion, with Güneş Sigorta
 2004-05 Turkish Championship -  Champion, with Güneş Sigorta
 2009-10 Aroma Women's Volleyball League -  Champion, with Fenerbahçe Acıbadem
 2009-10 Turkish Cup -  Runner-up, with Fenerbahçe Acıbadem
 2010 Turkish Super Cup -  Champion, with Fenerbahçe Acıbadem
 2009-10 CEV Champions League -  Runner-up, with Fenerbahçe Acıbadem
 2010 FIVB World Club Championship -  Champion, with Fenerbahçe Acıbadem
 2010-11 CEV Champions League -  Bronze medal, with Fenerbahçe Acıbadem
 2010-11 Aroma Women's Volleyball League -  Champion, with Fenerbahçe Acıbadem
 2011-12 CEV Champions League -  Champion, with Fenerbahçe Universal
 2012 FIVB Women's Club World Championship –  Bronze Medal, with Fenerbahçe
 2012-13 CEV Cup -  Runner-Up, with Fenerbahçe
 2013-14 CEV Cup -  Champion, with Fenerbahçe
 2016–17 CEV Women's Challenge Cup -  Champion, with Bursa BB

See also
 Turkish women in sports

References

External links
 Player profile at fenerbahce.org
 

1985 births
Living people
Volleyball players from Istanbul
Turkish women's volleyball players
Fenerbahçe volleyballers
VakıfBank S.K. volleyballers
Beşiktaş volleyballers
Galatasaray S.K. (women's volleyball) players
Mediterranean Games medalists in volleyball
Mediterranean Games silver medalists for Turkey
Competitors at the 2009 Mediterranean Games